In music, Op. 76 stands for Opus number 76. Compositions that are assigned this number include:

 Alkan – Trois grandes études
 Dvořák – Symphony No. 5
 Elgar – Polonia
 Haydn – String Quartets, Op. 76
 Prokofiev – Songs of Our Days
 Schumann – Four Marches (Vier Märsche) for piano
 Stanford – Much Ado About Nothing
 Strauss – Die Tageszeiten